Terry "Buzzy" Johnson (born Isaiah Johnson, November 12, 1938), is an American popular music singer, songwriter and music producer.

Early career 
Johnson was born in Baltimore, Maryland, and grew up as a neighbor of The Orioles' Sonny Til and The Swallows' Earl Hurley.  In 1954, Johnson formed The Whispers (no relation to the more famous Los Angeles-based group) with four high school friends, and recorded for Gotham Records (based in Philadelphia, Pennsylvania). He wrote, arranged and sang lead on "Fool Heart" and "Are You Sorry?", both released in 1955.

Johnson is the duet lead heard, along with Paul Wilson, on "Lovers Never Say Goodbye", "Love Walked In", "Time Was" and "But Not For Me", all Billboard chart hits (except the latter). He recorded three albums with The Flamingos, Flamingo Serenade, Requestfully Yours and Flamingo Favorites.  They toured extensively and appeared five times on the TV show American Bandstand.

Touring as The Flamingos featuring Terry Johnson
Shortly after Tommy Hunt left the group in 1961, the Flamingos split into two groups, one with the Careys and Paul Wilson and one with Terry Johnson and Nate Nelson calling themselves at varying times, the Modern Flamingos, the Fabulous Flamingos and later simply, Terry Johnson's Flamingos.  The two recorded on Atco together in 1963 as the Starglows.  The result was the Johnson-penned ballad "Let's Be Lovers" (b/w "Walk Away Softly", written by Skyliners' manager and "Since I Don't Have You" co-author Joe Rock).  Johnson wanted to record more than tour while Nelson, having a family to support by this time, wanted to perform.  Nelson joined The Platters shortly after.  Johnson re-recorded "Let's Be Lovers" in 2005, with artists Jeff Calloway and TeeTee for his own Hot Fun Record label. Johnson is the owner of "The Flamingos" federal trademark and leads the current incarnation of the group. The current lineup is Johnson, Starling Newsome, Stan Prinston and musical director Theresa Trigg. The Flamingos featuring Terry Johnson appeared on two PBS specials: Rock and Roll at Fifty (in which they were the only group to have more than two songs featured) and Doo Wop Cavalcade: The Definitive Anthology. In 2013, The Flamingos released the Diamond Anniversary Tour CD. They continue to perform in concerts across the country.

At Motown
In 1964, Smokey Robinson recruited Johnson onto the staff of Motown Records where he and Robinson became regular collaborators.  Their most notable credited work was the 1969 Billboard Top 10 hit for The Miracles, "Baby, Baby Don't Cry". Other charted hits include "Malinda" for Bobby Taylor & The Vancouvers and "Here I Go Again" for Smokey Robinson & The Miracles.  Johnson also wrote and produced for the Four Tops, the Temptations, Martha and the Vandellas and the Supremes. In 1969, Johnson released the solo 45's "My Springtime" and "Whatcha Gonna Do", both b/w "Suzie" on Gordy Records (a Motown subsidiary.) He then released the follow-up "Stone Soul Booster" b/w "Sandy" under the name "Buzzie".  When Smokey moved to California in 1974, Johnson remained in Detroit and later had a short-lived stint as Harold Melvin & The Blue-Notes’ musical conductor.

Awards, accolades and latter-day ventures
In 1996, Johnson and the surviving Flamingos were awarded the Rhythm & Blues Foundation's Pioneer Award and in 2001, Johnson was inducted into the Rock and Roll Hall of Fame with The Flamingos.  Shortly after, he re-focused his energy on touring as Terry Johnson's Flamingos, establishing the group as a mainstay of casinos and major concert package tours.  In 2003, Johnson was honored by NARAS as "I Only Have Eyes For You" was inducted into the Grammy Award Hall of Fame.  He is also an inductee of The Vocal Group Hall of Fame and has received the Heroes & Legends Award (HAL).

In 2017, Johnson released two No. 1 singles on the European Indie Music Chart breaking records for being No. 1 for four weeks and is featured on multiple playlist on Spotify. Pollstar Magazine calls him the "Musical Chameleon". Boyz II Men recruited him and his producing partner Theresa Trigg for their 2017 CD release Under The Streetlight, where they re-produced his famous arrangement of "I Only Have Eyes For You", which Johnson had arranged, sang and played guitar on for The Flamingos.

In 2013, Johnson released the Diamond Anniversary Tour 2013 CD to commemorate the 60th anniversary of The Flamingos. In 2015, The Flamingos, appeared on The View with Whoopi Goldberg.

References

1938 births
Living people
American rhythm and blues musicians
The Flamingos members
Musicians from Baltimore
Songwriters from Maryland
Record producers from Maryland
African-American songwriters
Motown artists
African-American record producers
21st-century African-American people
20th-century African-American people